Quentin Bajac (born 1965) is a French museum curator and art historian specialising in the history of photography. He is the director of the Galerie nationale du Jeu de Paume in Paris.

Bajac has held positions at the Musée d'Orsay (1995–2003), Centre Georges Pompidou (2003–2010), Musée National d'Art Moderne and École du Louvre (2010–2013) and Museum of Modern Art (MoMA) (2013–2018).

He has published a number of works on photography, most notably the three-volume series——on the history of photography (2000–2010), which belongs to the collection Découvertes Gallimard, as well as Parr by Parr: Discussions with a Promiscuous Photographer (2011), Stephen Shore: Solving Pictures (2017), Being Modern: MoMA in Paris (co-author with Olivier Michelon, 2017).

In 2013 Bajac was made a Chevalier (knight) of the Ordre des Arts et des Lettres.

Career 
After gaining a diploma of the Institut national du patrimoine, Bajac was appointed Curator of Photography at the Musée d'Orsay in 1995 before joining the Centre Georges Pompidou in 2003, where he has been an associate curator in the Photography Department. In January 2013, he was appointed The Joel and Anne Ehrenkranz Chief Curator of Photography at the Museum of Modern Art (MoMA) in New York City. Bajac remained in that post at MoMA until becoming director of the Galerie nationale du Jeu de Paume in Paris in November 2018.

As the chief curator of photography at MoMA, he organised A World of Its Own: Photographic Practices in the Studio (2014), Scenes for a New Heritage: Contemporary Art from the Collection (2015), and Stephen Shore (2018).

Honours 
 Chevalier (knight) of the Ordre des Arts et des Lettres (2013)

series 
 L'image révélée : L'invention de la photographie, coll. « Découvertes Gallimard » (nº 414), série Arts. Paris: Gallimard, 2001 
 US edition – The Invention of Photography, "Abrams Discoveries" series. New York: Harry N. Abrams, 2002 
 UK edition – The Invention of Photography: The First Fifty Years, ‘New Horizons’ series. London: Thames & Hudson, 2002 
 La photographie : L'époque moderne 1880-1960, coll. « Découvertes Gallimard » (nº 473), série Arts. Paris: Gallimard, 2005 
 Après la photographie ? : De l'argentique à la révolution numérique, coll. « Découvertes Gallimard » (nº 559), série Arts. Paris: Gallimard, 2010

Publications
 L'ABCdaire du Musée d'Orsay, Flammarion, 1999 
 Tableaux vivants. Fantaisies photographiques victoriennes, 1840-1880, Réunion des Musées Nationaux, 1999 
 With Alain Sayag & Martine d'Astier, Lartigue : l'album d'une vie, 1894-1986, 2003
 With Christian Caujolle, The Abrams Encyclopedia of Photography, Harry N. Abrams, 2004
 With Clément Chéroux, Collection photographies : une histoire de la photographie à travers les collections du Centre Pompidou, Musée national d'art moderne, coédition Centre Pompidou/Steidl, 2007 
 With C. Chéroux, La subversion des images : surréalisme, photographie, film, Éd. du Centre Pompidou, 2009 
 Le corps en éclats, Éd. du Centre Pompidou, 2009 
 Miroslav Tichy, Éd. du Centre Pompidou, 2009 
 La photographie, du daguerréotype au numérique, coll. « Découvertes Gallimard Hors série ». Paris: Gallimard, 2010 
 C. Chéroux ed., with Man Ray, Man Ray : Portraits : Paris - Hollywood - Paris, Éd. du Centre Pompidou, 2010 
 Man Ray: Portraits : Paris, Hollywood, Paris : from the Man Ray Archives of the Centre Pompidou, Prestel Pub, 2011
 With Martin Parr, Le mélange des genres, Textuel, 2010 
 Parr by Parr: Quentin Bajac Meets Martin Parr : Discussions with a Promiscuous Photographer, Schilt, 2010
 Mimmo Jodice. Les Yeux du Louvre, Paris/Arles, coéd. Musée du Louvre/Actes Sud, 2011 
 With , Brassaï, le flaneur nocturne, Gallimard, 2012 
 Robert Doisneau : « Pêcheur d'images », coll. « Découvertes Gallimard » (nº 581), série Arts. Paris: Gallimard, 2012 
 With Olivier Michelon, Being Modern: MoMA in Paris, Thames & Hudson, 2017
 Stephen Shore: Solving Pictures, Thames & Hudson, 2017

References 

Living people
1965 births
French curators
French art historians
Historians of photography
21st-century French essayists
École du Louvre alumni
Chevaliers of the Ordre des Arts et des Lettres